The Lithuanian Russian Union (LRS;  Soyuz russkikh Litvy) is a political party in Lithuania that represents Russians in Lithuania.

Since 2007, the party has formed an alliance with the Electoral Action of Poles in Lithuania, which represents Lithuania's Poles.

See also
 Electoral Action of Poles in Lithuania
 Alliance of Russians, a smaller party representing Russian minority

References

 Lithuanian Russian Union official website 

Conservative parties in Lithuania
Russian diaspora political parties
1995 establishments in Lithuania